Pseudoamuria uptoni is a moth of the family Zygaenidae. It is found in Cape York, Queensland, Australia.

The length of the forewings is 6.5 mm for males and 7 mm for females. The wings are short. The upperside of the forewings is dark greenish grey with a purple sheen and the underside is whitish grey, but darker towards the apex. The hindwings are opaque, dark greenish grey, with a distinct, densely scaled, white streak behind cell running from the base to the centre of the wing. The underside is similar but whitish grey proximally and darker distally.

References

Moths described in 2005
Procridinae